Salt River Township is one of eight townships in Audrain County, Missouri, United States. As of the 2010 census, its population was 9,497.

Salt River Township was established in 1837, and named for a river of the same name within its borders.

Geography
It contains part of one incorporated city, Mexico (the county seat). Unincorporated places include Champ, Francis (railroad station; formerly Felton), Molino (former post office), Ortiz (railroad station; formerly Doan, and also known as Ortiz Station), Salt River (former post office), and Young's Creek (former post office).

The streams of Brushy Branch, Fish Branch, Fivemile Creek, Little Skull Lick Creek, Middle Lick Creek and Skull Lick Creek run through this township.

There are four cemeteries in the township: Elmwood, Mount Zion, Saint Brendans and Trinity.

References

 USGS Geographic Names Information System (GNIS)

External links
 US-Counties.com
 City-Data.com

Townships in Audrain County, Missouri
Townships in Missouri